Schoorlea is a genus of moths in the family Cossidae. It contains only one species, Schoorlea duffelsi, which is found on Sulawesi.

References

Natural History Museum Lepidoptera generic names catalog

Zeuzerinae